Omar Abdulaziz (born 17 December 1983)  is a Saudi footballer currently playing for Al-Kawkab as a midfielder.

References

Living people
1983 births
Saudi Arabian footballers
Al-Faisaly FC players
Al-Kawkab FC players
Saudi First Division League players
Saudi Professional League players
Saudi Second Division players
Association football midfielders